The Foreign Police is an agency that is responsible for border checks in the Czech Republic.

References

External links
Official website of the Foreign Police

Law enforcement agencies in the Czech Republic